CANDU Owners Group  is a private, not-for-profit corporation funded voluntarily by CANDU operating utilities worldwide, Canadian Nuclear Laboratories (CNL) and supplier participants. It is dedicated to providing programs for cooperation, mutual assistance and exchange of information for the successful support, development, operation, maintenance and economics of CANDU technology. All CANDU Operators in the world are members of COG. This includes plants in Canada (Pickering Nuclear Generating Station, Darlington Nuclear Generating Station, Bruce Nuclear Generating Station and Point Lepreau Nuclear Generating Station), Argentina (Embalse Nuclear Power Station), China (Qinshan Nuclear Power Plant), India (Rajasthan Atomic Power Station), Pakistan (Karachi Nuclear Power Complex), South Korea (Wolseong Nuclear Power Plant), and Romania (Cernavodă Nuclear Power Plant). Its headquarters is in Toronto, Ontario, Canada.

COG was formed in 1984 by an agreement among the Canadian CANDU-owning utilities Ontario Hydro (now Ontario Power Generation), Hydro-Québec and New Brunswick Power, plus Atomic Energy of Canada Limited. It became a non-profit corporation in 1999.

References

Nuclear industry organizations